Red Rover is a 2018 Canadian science fiction romantic comedy film, directed by Shane Belcourt. The film stars Kristian Bruun as Damon, a depressed and lonely geologist who decides that the solution to his problems is to apply for a Mars to Stay mission, when he meets and falls in love with Phoebe (Cara Gee), a musician who is involved in the promotional campaign to solicit mission volunteers.

The cast also includes Meghan Heffern, Anna Hopkins, Morgan David Jones, Joshua Peace, Laura Wilson and Sugith Varughese.

The film premiered on November 13, 2018 at the Whistler Film Festival, and was screened at the 2019 Canadian Film Festival, before being released commercially in 2020.

Critical response
Several critics, including Chris Knight of the National Post and Barry Hertz of The Globe and Mail, criticized the film for resurrecting the Manic Pixie Dream Girl trope popular in independent films of the early 2010s.

References

External links

2018 films
2018 science fiction films
2018 romantic comedy films
Canadian science fiction comedy films
Canadian romantic comedy films
English-language Canadian films
Films directed by Shane Belcourt
2010s English-language films
2010s Canadian films